Francis Hopkinson Griswold (November 5, 1904 – April 11, 1989) was an American Air Force lieutenant general who was commandant of the National War College in Washington, D.C. and vice commander in chief, Strategic Air Command.

Early life
Griswold was born in Erie, Pennsylvania, in 1904. He attended Columbia University in New York City and Ohio State University, Columbus, Ohio, before entering military service as an aviation cadet in September 1928. He completed flying training at Kelly Field, Texas, in October 1929.

He spent the next several years as a pilot performing normal squadron duties with various air units in Michigan, Illinois, Hawaii, California and Virginia.

World War II
Shortly after the U.S. entered World War II, he was named as chief of the Training Section, Headquarters Army Air Forces, Washington, D.C.

He was transferred in July 1943 to the Eighth Air Force in England where he served successively as chief of staff of the 8th Fighter Command, the 2nd Bomb Division, and the Eighth Air Force. He went to the Pacific in July 1945 as commanding general of the 301st Fighter Wing on Okinawa, and the following October returned to the United States.

Cold War
From December 1945 until July 1946 he was deputy assistant chief of the Air Staff for operations, Headquarters Army Air Forces. He then assumed command of the 20th Air Force on Guam until September 1948 when he returned to Headquarters U.S. Air force as assistant deputy chief of staff for materiel.

He was named Air Force staff member of the Munitions Board in December 1950, and in May 1952 was reassigned to the United Kingdom to command the U.S. Third Air Force.

He became vice commander in chief of the Strategic Air Command (SAC) in April 1954, where he remained until July 1, 1961, when he was named commandant, the National War College, Washington, D.C.

Retirement
He retired August 1, 1964.

Lieutenant General Griswold died of heart failure at Saddleback Community Hospital in Laguna Hills, California; he was 84 years old.

Awards and decorations

References

Columbia University alumni
United States Army Air Forces personnel of World War II
United States Air Force generals
Recipients of the Legion of Merit
Recipients of the Croix de Guerre 1939–1945 (France)
Amateur radio people
1904 births
1989 deaths
United States Army Air Forces officers